Google Darfur is a 2007 documentary film directed by Robert Simental-Ruybe. The film exposes dangerous conditions such as rape and violence in Eastern Chad for refugees living in the camps and major inefficiencies of the camp management. Google Darfur was submitted into evidence in the International Criminal Court (ICC) case against Sudanese President Omar Bashir.

Development 
The documentary was shot on HD video in Eastern Chad in early 2007, and independently released to DVD in the United States on October 9, 2007 via FilmBaby.  The documentary was shot in several towns and refugee camps in Eastern Chad, including Gaga, Farchana, Adre, Breidjing and Abeche. The video crew consisted of director Robert Simental-Ruybe, cameraman Matt Bowen, translator Ahmed Borgoto and driver Zakaria Mahamat.

A 28-minute cut of the documentary was broadcast on Seattle Community Access Television by Indymedia on February 26, 2009 then subsequently on other IndyMedia partner stations.

A 2020 version of Google Darfur was produced and released for free on Youtube in April 2020, in order to reflect the changes on the ground after the 2019 ousting of president Omar al-Bashir.

References

External links
 
 

2007 films
Documentary films about refugees
Documentary films about the War in Darfur
Films set in Chad
2000s English-language films